Joe Cocker is the third studio album by Joe Cocker, released in 1972 in Europe as Something to Say on Cube Records, and in the USA as Joe Cocker on A&M Records. It contains the hit single "High Time We Went", that was released in the summer of 1971. Joe Cocker signalled Cocker's change of direction into a more jazzy, blues style. The album reached no. 30 in the US album charts. However, although it received a positive response from the press, it made no impression on the British and European charts.

It is an unusual LP among Joe Cocker albums, in that he wrote the lyrics to six songs. Five of them were co-written with Chris Stainton between 1969 and 1972. "Something To Say" was written with Nichols.  However, the album's main claim to fame might be that one of its tracks, "Woman to Woman", was the basis for Tupac Shakur's successful hit single "California Love".

The album, re-titled as Something to Say, was originally released on CD in 1990 by Castle Communications and in 1998 a remastered edition of the album was released worldwide on A&M Records. Alan White, soon to be Yes' drummer, played on this album alongside Jim Keltner, after he was featured on George Harrison's All Things Must Pass and John Lennon's Live Peace in Toronto, Imagine and Sometime in New-York City albums. Conrad Isidore played with Steve Stills and Hummingbird, among others. Percussionist Rebop Kwaku Baah was known for his work with Traffic and the German band Can.

Track listing 
All tracks composed by Joe Cocker and Chris Stainton, except where indicated.

Side One

 "Pardon Me Sir" – 3:17
 "High Time We Went" – 4:25
 "She Don't Mind" – 3:13
 "Black-Eyed Blues" – 4:37
 "Something to Say" (Joe Cocker, Peter Nicholls) – 5:00

Side Two

 "Midnight Rider" (Gregg Allman, Robert Payne) – 4:00
 "Do Right Woman" (live) (Dan Penn, Chips Moman) – 7:00
 "Woman to Woman" – 4:26
 "St. James Infirmary" (live) (Traditional, Frank Assunto; arranged by Chris Stainton and Joe Cocker) – 6:10

On the album's release, the tracks that received the most attention on radio were "Black-Eyed Blues", "Woman to Woman" and the cover version of Gregg Allman's "Midnight Rider", which charted on the Billboard Hot 100, peaking at number 27.

In 1996, the horn-and-piano riff from "Woman to Woman" was sampled by Tupac Shakur in his song "California Love"; it was a smash hit for Tupac, reaching No. 1 on the Billboard Hot 100. "Woman to Woman" was also featured in the soundtrack for the 2004 video game Grand Theft Auto: San Andreas, on the fictional classic rock radio station K-DST.

Personnel 
 Joe Cocker – lead vocals, arrangements (9)
 Chris Stainton – acoustic piano, Hammond organ, arrangements (9)
 Neil Hubbard – guitars
 Alan Spenner – bass
 Jim Keltner – drums 
 Alan White – drums 
 Conrad Isidore – drums (7, 9)
 Felix "Flaco" Falcon – assorted percussion
 Rebop Kwaku Baah – congas (7)
 Fred Scerbo – saxophone 
 Milton Sloan – saxophone 
 Jim Horn – saxophone (7)
 Rick Alphonso – trumpet 
 Virginia Ayers – backing vocals 
 Beverly Gardner – backing vocals
 Gloria Jones – backing vocals 
 Viola Wills – backing vocals, lead vocals (7)

(A sticker placed on original issue albums read "Featuring the Chris Stainton Band and the Sanctified Sisters")

Production notes 
 All songs recorded in 1972, except "High Time We Went" and "Black Eyed Blues", which were recorded in 1971; "Do Right Woman" and "St. James Infirmary" recorded live.
 Denny Cordell – producer (1-6, 9)
 Nigel Thomas – producer (6-9)
 Roland Young – art direction 
 John Cabalka – design 
 Peter Smith – photography
"Special thanks to Marvin Bornstein and Bart Chiate without whose special assistance this album could not have been completed. Thanks as well to Bob Potter and Chris Kimsey and to Gail Stainton, Charis Mitchell and Eileen Weaver who provided constant support to their old men."

Trivia
When A&M placed an advertisement for the album in Creem magazine, the ad copy read: "There is only one man in the world who can release an album named 'Joe Cocker'"

Chart performance

References

All song and personnel information gathered from the liner notes of the album Joe Cocker (Copyright © 1972 by A&M Records), as issued by A&M Records in the U.S.

1972 albums
Joe Cocker albums
Albums produced by Denny Cordell
A&M Records albums